HD 15920 is a single star in the northern constellation of Cassiopeia. It has a yellow hue and is visible to the naked eye as a dim point of light with an apparent visual magnitude of 5.17. This object is located at a distance of approximately 268 light years from the Sun based on parallax, but it is drifting closer with a radial velocity of −4 km/s.

This object is an aging giant star with a stellar classification of G8III. After exhausting the supply of hydrogen at its core, this star has cooled and expanded off the main sequence – at present it has ten times the girth of the Sun. The star is around a billion years old with 2.6 times the mass of the Sun. It is radiating 61 times the Sun's luminosity from its swollen photosphere at an effective temperature of 5,080 K. HD 15920 is the most likely source for the X-ray emission detected at these coordinates.

References

G-type giants
Cassiopeia (constellation)
Durchmusterung objects
015920
012273
0743